Qin County or Qinxian is a county in the southeast-central part of Shanxi province, China. It is under the administration of Changzhi city.

It comprises the towns of Dingchang (定昌镇), Guocun (郭村镇), Guxian (故县镇), Xindian (新店镇), Zhangyuan (漳源镇), and Cecun (册村镇) and the townships of Duanliu (段柳乡), Songcun (松村乡), Cicun (次村乡), Niusi (牛寺乡), Nanli (南里乡), Nanquan (南泉乡), and Yang'an (杨安乡).

Climate

References

Weblinks
www.xzqh.org 

County-level divisions of Shanxi
Changzhi